For Ladies Only is a 1927 American silent comedy film directed by Henry Lehrman and Scott Pembroke and starring John Bowers, Jacqueline Logan and Edna Marion.

Synopsis
A businessman thinks that all women are frivolous creatures only interested in clothes, make-up and perfume. He decides to fire all his women employees including his female secretary Ruth Barton who warns him he will comes to regret it. Finding himself at a loss he turns to her for advice over business deals, but she makes him pay a great deal for it. Finally she intercepts a major order and directs it towards a rival firm. He is forced to concede defeat and agrees to her demand to let all the women return to their jobs, discovering in the process that he is in love with Ruth.

Cast
 John Bowers as Cliff Coleman
 Jacqueline Logan as Ruth Barton
 Edna Marion as 	Gertie Long
 Ben Hall as Joe Decker
 William H. Strauss as Mr. Ginsberg
 Templar Saxe	
 Kathleen Chambers		
 Henry Roquemore

References

Bibliography
 Connelly, Robert B. The Silents: Silent Feature Films, 1910-36, Volume 40, Issue 2. December Press, 1998.
 Munden, Kenneth White. The American Film Institute Catalog of Motion Pictures Produced in the United States, Part 1. University of California Press, 1997.

External links
 

1927 films
1927 comedy films
1920s English-language films
American silent feature films
Silent American comedy films
American black-and-white films
Films directed by Henry Lehrman
Films directed by Scott Pembroke
Columbia Pictures films
1920s American films